WVGM (1320 kHz) is a commercial AM radio station licensed to Lynchburg, Virginia.  It broadcasts a sports radio format and is owned and operated by 3 Daughters Media.  Most programming comes from CBS Sports Radio.  

By day, WVGM is powered at 1,000 watts non-directional.  But to protect other stations on 1320 AM from interference, it reduces power at night to only 24 watts.  Programming is also heard on 250-watt FM translator W227BG at 93.3 MHz.

History
The call sign was WDMS. It was originally a daytimer, required to go off the air at night. In the 1970s, the station was Top 40 outlet WLGM. It played the current hits and was an affiliate of the ABC Entertainment Network.

3 Daughters Media bought WVGM and WGMN from Clear Channel Communications in a deal announced late in 2006.

References

External links
ESPN in Virginia Online

VGM
ESPN Radio stations
Sports radio stations in the United States
Radio stations established in 1991